Sydney Fairbrother (31 July 1872 – 4 January 1941) was a British actress.

Born Sydney Tapping on 31 July 1872 in London to actor/playwright Alfred B. Tapping and actress Florence Cowell, she was educated at Blackpool and Bonn. She made her stage debut in Birmingham in 1890 with the famous Kendall Company and a few years later toured America with them. She came to the screen in 1915 in a film called Iron Justice and chiefly appeared in comedy roles. She retired in 1938 and died on 4 January 1941 in London, aged 68.

Selected filmography

 Iron Justice (1915) - Mrs. O'Connor
 The Game of Liberty (1916) - Mrs. Bundercombe
 Temptation's Hour (1916)
 The Mother of Dartmoor (1916) - Mrs. Bolt
 Auld Lang Syne (1917) - Mrs. Potter
 Faith (1919) - Lavinia Brooker
 A Temporary Gentleman (1920) - Mrs. Hope
 Laddie (1920) - Mrs. Carter
 The Children of Gibeon (1920) - Mrs. Gibeon
 The Bachelor's Club (1921) - Tabitha
 The Rotters (1921) - Jemima Nivet
 The Golden Dawn (1921) - Mrs. Briggs
 Married Love (1923) - Mrs. Burrows
 Love, Life and Laughter (1923) - Lily
 The Rest Cure (1923) - Mrs. George
 The Beloved Vagabond (1923) - Mrs. Smith
 Heartstrings (1923) - Mrs.Chadwick
 Sally Bishop (1923) - Landlady
 Don Quixote (1923) - Tereza
 Wanted, a Boy (1924, Short) - The Aunt
 Love and Hate (1924, Short)
 Reveille (1924) - Sophie Fitch
 A Friend of Cupid (1925, Short) - Mrs. May
 A Fowl Proceeding (1925, Short) - Mrs. May
 Nell Gwyn (1926) - Mrs. Gwyn
 The Silver Lining (1927) - Mrs. Akers
 My Lord the Chauffeur (1927) - Lady Parr
 Confetti (1928) - Duchess Maxine
 The Rosary (1931) - Minor role (uncredited)
 Bindle (1931)
 Murder on the Second Floor (1932) - Miss Snell
 The Temperance Fete (1932) - Mrs. Bindle
 The Third String (1932) - Miss Peabody
 Double Dealing (1932) - Sarah Moon
 Down Our Street (1932) - Maggie Anning
 The Return of Raffles (1932)
 Insult (1932) - Arabella
 Lucky Ladies (1932) - Angle Tuckett
 The Return of Raffles (1932) - Lady Truwode
 Excess Baggage (1933) - Miss Toop
 Dora (1933, Short) - Mother
 Home, Sweet Home (1933) - Mrs. Bagshow
 The Crucifix (1934) - Lavinia Brooker
 Chu Chin Chow (1934) - Mahbubah Baba - Ali's Wife
 Gay Love (1934) - Dukie
 Brewster's Millions (1935) - Miss Plimsole
 The Private Secretary (1935) - Miss Ashford
 Fame (1936) - Train Passenger
 The Last Journey (1936) - Mrs. Grebe
 All In (1936) - Genesta Slott
 Dreaming Lips (1937) - Mrs. Stanway
 Rose of Tralee (1937) - Mrs. Thompson
 King Solomon's Mines (1937) - Gagool (uncredited)
 Paradise for Two (1937) - Miss Clare
 Make It Three (1938) - Aunt Aggie
 Little Dolly Daydream (1938) - Mrs. Harris

References

External links

1872 births
1941 deaths
English film actresses
English silent film actresses
English stage actresses
Actresses from London
20th-century English actresses